Eli Babayev (born 1 November 1990) is a professional footballer who plays as a midfielder for Hapoel Ramat Gan. Born in Israel, he represented the Azerbaijan national team.

Career

Club
Babayev made his professional debut for Hapoel Ra'anana in the Israeli Premier League on 26 October 2013, coming on as a substitute in the 84th minute for Assi Baldout in the 0–0 draw against Bnei Yehuda Tel Aviv.

International
Babayev was called up to the Azerbaijan national team for the first time in March 2019 for the UEFA Euro 2020 qualifying match against Croatia and a friendly against Lithuania.

Career statistics

International

Statistics accurate as of match played 25 March 2019

References

External links
 
 

1990 births
Living people
Citizens of Azerbaijan through descent
Azerbaijani footballers
Israeli footballers
Association football midfielders
Hapoel Ra'anana A.F.C. players
Hapoel Marmorek F.C. players
Sumgayit FK players
Maccabi Petah Tikva F.C. players
Israeli Premier League players
Liga Leumit players
Azerbaijan Premier League players
Israeli people of Azerbaijani-Jewish descent
Israeli people of Mountain Jewish descent
Azerbaijan international footballers
Footballers from Ra'anana